Eucereon minutum is a moth of the subfamily Arctiinae. It was described by Herbert Druce in 1884. It is found in Panama.

References

 

minutum
Moths described in 1884